Rudolf Albert Raff (November 10, 1941 – January 5, 2019) was an American biologist, and James H. Rudy Professor of Biology at Indiana University. He was known for research in, and promotion of, evolutionary developmental biology. He was also director of the Indiana Molecular Biology Institute.


Life
Raff was born in Shawnigan, Quebec in 1941 to a family of Jewish immigrants from Eastern Europe.  He graduated from Pennsylvania State University with a B.S. in 1963, and from Duke University with a Ph.D. in 1967. He died in 2019 in Bloomington Hospital, Indiana, at the age of 77.

Awards
Raff was a 1987 Guggenheim Fellow.
He won the 2004 Sewall Wright Award, and won the A.O. Kovalevsky Medal in 2001.
He was a Fellow of the American Association for the Advancement of Science.

Works
with Thomas C. Kaufman, Illustrated by E.C. Raff, Embryos, Genes, and Evolution: The Developmental-Genetic Basis of Evolutionary Change, Macmillan 1983, 
The shape of life: genes, development, and the evolution of animal form, University of Chicago Press, 1996, 
William R. Jeffery, Rudolf A. Raff (eds), Time, space, and pattern in embryonic development, A.R. Liss, 1983, 
Rudolf A. Raff, Once We All Had Gills, Growing Up Evolutionist in an Evolving World, Indiana University Press 2012,

References

External links
http://www.americanscientist.org/authors/detail/rudolf-raff 

1941 births
2019 deaths
People from Shawinigan
21st-century American biologists
Canadian biologists
Indiana University faculty
Pennsylvania State University alumni
Duke University alumni
Fellows of the American Association for the Advancement of Science
Fellows of the American Academy of Arts and Sciences
Jewish scientists